The 2015 Charleston Southern Buccaneers football team represented Charleston Southern University as a member of the Big South Conference during the 2015 NCAA Division I FCS football season. Led by Jamey Chadwell in his fourth and final season as head coach, the Buccaneers compiled an overall record of 7–4 with a mark of 4–1 in conference play, sharing the Big South title with Liberty. Charleston Southern earned the conference's automatic bid to the NCAA Division I Football Championship playoffs, where the Buccaneers lost in the first round to Wofford. Charleston Southern played home games at Buccaneer Field in Charleston, South Carolina.

Schedule

The game between Charleston Southern and Albany State was postponed in advance of the arrival of Hurricane Matthew. A future date for the game has not yet been announced.

Game summaries

at North Dakota State

Kentucky State

at Florida State

at Monmouth

at Coastal Carolina

Albany State
The game between Charleston Southern and Albany State was postponed in advance of the arrival of Hurricane Matthew.

Presbyterian

Bucknell

Gardner–Webb

Liberty

Kennesaw State

Wofford—NCAA Division I First Round

Ranking movements

References

Charleston Southern
Charleston Southern Buccaneers football seasons
Big South Conference football champion seasons
Charleston Southern
Charleston Southern Buccaneers football